Wrinkles are folds, ridges, or creases in the skin or on fabric.

Wrinkle or Wrinkles may also refer to:

Art and Entertainment 
 Wrinkles (film), a 2011 Spanish animated film
 Wrinkles (radio series), a BBC radio comedy series
 "Wrinkles" (song), a 2002 song by Diamond Rio
 Wrinkles (toy), a line of plush toys

People 
 Margaret Wrinkle, American writer and documentary film maker
 Eric Wrinkles (1960–2009), convicted multiple murderer

See also